Bioko (historically Fernando Po) is an island  off the west coast of Africa and the northernmost part of Equatorial Guinea. The island is part of the Cameroon line of volcanoes and is located off the Cameroon coast, in the Bight of Biafra portion of the Gulf of Guinea. Malabo, on the north coast of the island, is the capital city of Equatorial Guinea.

Etymology
Bioko's native name is Ëtulá a Ëri in the Bube language. For nearly 500 years, the island was known as Fernando Po, named for Portuguese navigator Fernão do Pó. Between 1973 and 1979 the island was named Macías Nguema Biyogo after the then president of Equatorial Guinea; the current name, Bioko, dates from 1979 and is in honour of politician Cristino Seriche Bioko.

Geography

The island is mostly covered by tropical rainforest. It is volcanic and very mountainous with the highest peak Pico Basile. It thus resembles neighbouring islands São Tomé and Príncipe. Like them, it lies on the Cameroon line. Its southernmost point is called Punta Santiago.

Bioko lies on the African continental shelf, separated from the African mainland by  water with a depth of only 60 metres. During the Pleistocene epoch Bioko was connected to the African mainland. Bioko separated from Africa around 10,000 years ago, at the end of the Last Glacial Period.

The fire skink, a species of lizard found on the island, carries the scientific name of Mochlus fernandi, derived from Fernando Po, the former name of the island.

Fernando Po (with the spelling "Poo") is the setting for a Cold War standoff in Robert Shea and Robert Anton Wilson's Illuminatus Trilogy.

Geology 
The island is composed mostly of basalt, mostly alkali basalt and hawaiites, and to a lesser extent mugearites.

Demographics
The island has a population of 335,048 inhabitants (2015 Census). Its historic indigenous people are the Bubi people, who currently constitute 58% of the population. Other ethnicities include the Fang at 16%, Fernandinos at 12%, and the Igbo at 7%, as well as African and European immigrants.

Languages
Spanish has been an official language since 1844 when Spain took control of the island. It is still the language of education and administration, related to the more than 100 years as a Spanish colony. 67.6% of Equatoguineans can speak Spanish, especially those living in the capital, Malabo, on Bioko.

The Bube language, with about 50,000 speakers, and various dialects, is the original language of the inhabitants of Bioko.

However, given the numerous ethnic groups and peoples who operated on Bioko, a creole language developed, known as Pichi. It is based on English grammar, from the period when the British operated bases for their forces. It also incorporates West African languages from Nigeria and Liberia, Portuguese vocabulary which forms a considerable part of the Krio language, which had developed in Sierra Leone. Workers came from all these areas in the 19th through much of the 20th century.

History
The island was inhabited in the middle of the first millennium BC by Bantu tribes from the mainland, who formed the Bubi ethnic group. Unlike other islands in the area, Bioko had an indigenous African population. The Bubi speak a Bantu language. The island has probably been inhabited by this or other Bantu-speaking groups since before the 7th century BC.

In 1472, the Portuguese navigator Fernão do Pó was the first European to sight the island. He named it Formosa Flora ("beautiful flower"). In 1494 it was renamed Fernando Po in his honor after being claimed as a colony by the Portuguese. The Portuguese developed the island for sugarcane crops, and while considered poor quality, the refineries' output was such that Fernando Po sugar briefly dominated the trade centres in Europe.

In 1642, the Dutch East India Company established trade bases on the island without Portuguese consent. It temporarily centralized from there its slave trade in the Gulf of Guinea. The Portuguese appeared again on the island in 1648, replacing the Dutch Company with one of their own, also dedicated to slave trading and established in its neighbour island Corisco.

Parallel with this establishment, the Bubi clans began the slow process of establishing the core of a new kingdom on the island, especially after the activity of some local chiefs such as Molambo (approx. 1700–1760). During a period when enslavement was increasing in the region, local clans abandoned their coastal settlements and settled in the safer hinterland.

Under the 1778 Treaty of El Pardo, Portugal ceded Fernando Po, Annobón, and the Guinea coast, Río Muni, to Spain, which together form modern Equatorial Guinea. The treaty was signed by Queen Mary I of Portugal and King Charles III of Spain, in exchange for territory on the American continent. Spain mounted an expedition to Fernando Po, led by the Conde de Argelejos, who stayed for four months. In October 1778, Spain installed a governor on the island who stayed until 1780, when the Spanish mission left the island.

Chief Molambo was succeeded by another local leader, Lorite (1760–1810), who was succeeded by Lopoa (1810–1842). After abolishing the British Atlantic slave trade, from 1827 to 1843 the British leased bases at Port Clarence (modern Malabo) and San Carlos for the African Slave Trade Patrol. The settlement at Port Clarence (named after the Duke of Clarence) was constructed under the supervision of William Fitzwilliam Owen. He had previously mapped most of the coasts of Africa and was a zealous anti-slaver. During his three-year command, his forces detained 20 ships and liberated 2,500 slaves. The Mixed Commission Court was moved from Freetown, Sierra Leone, to Clarence to hasten the legal process of emancipating slaves liberated from slave ships.

In March 1843, Juan José Lerena planted the Spanish flag in Port Clarence (renamed Santa Isabel), starting the decline of British influence on the island. Spain revoked the British lease in 1855. Madabita (1842–1860) and Sepoko (1860–1875) were principal local chiefs during the period when Spain re-established its control of the island. A notable resident from 1861 to 1865 was the British explorer Richard Burton who served as the British consul, during which time he wrote several books about Africa.This period was also marked by Spain's transport deportation here of several hundred Afro-Cubans, as well as dozens of Spanish scholars and politicians considered politically undesirable. In addition Spain exiled 218 revolutionaries here from the Philippine Revolution, of whom only 94 survived for long.

In 1923–1930, the League of Nations investigated the transportation of contract migrant labour between Liberia and the Spanish colony of Fernando Po. Although the League concentrated its attention on arrangements in Liberia, a closer examination revealed that labour abuse arose from conditions on Fernando Po. In the last quarter of the 19th century, Krio planters on the island had shifted from palm oil trading to cocoa cultivation. Their dependence on migrant labour and increasing competition with Europeans resulted in an economic crisis in the first years of the twentieth century. Planters detained labour but failed to pay their contracts, resulting in a situation of de facto slavery. Liberia prohibited labor traders from contracting with their citizens.

During the Nigerian Civil War in the 20th century, relief agencies used the island as a base for flights into the secessionist Republic of Biafra.

Economy

Located on Punta Europa, west of Malabo, the Alba Gas Plant processes natural gas delivered from offshore production wells. The plant is operated by Marathon Oil Company through its subsidiary, Marathon Equatorial Guinea Production Limited. The plant produces natural gas liquids including propane, butane, and condensate products. The majority of the residue gas from the Alba plant is delivered to a natural gas liquefaction plant operated by EG LNG. A portion of the Alba plant residue is also delivered to the Atlantic Methanol Production Company and is used to produce methanol. The products from all three plants are loaded onto ocean-going tanker ships for export.

Transport
A rectangular transport route links the four main cities: Malabo, Luba, Baney, and Riaba. The island's airport is Malabo International Airport.

Tourism

See also

 Annobón, an island
 Bight of Bonny also known as the Bight of Biafra
 Bioko drill
 Bioko Norte Province
 Bioko Sur Province
 Cameroon line
 Equatorial Guinea
 Emancipados, black people in Spanish Guinea assimilated to the Spaniards.
 Fernandino peoples
 Fernão do Pó, commander of the first European ship to land here.
 Gulf of Guinea
 Leopold Janikowski, Polish explorer who visited the island in 1883
 Kru people
 Tetteh Quarshie, a Ghanaian who introduced cocoa to his native country from the island.
 Luba Crater Scientific Reserve
 Movement for the Self-Determination of Bioko Island
 The English-lexicon Creole Pichi is spoken on Bioko
 Postage stamps and postal history of Fernando Po

References

 Room, Adrian (1994). African placenames. Jefferson, North Carolina (USA): McFarland. 
 Sundiata, Ibrahim K. (1990). Equatorial Guinea: Colonialism, State Terror, and the Search for Stability. Boulder, Colorado (USA): Westview Press.

External links

 The Drill Project
 Bioko Biodiversity Protection Program
 Gulf of Guinea Conservation Group
 Bubi history and culture from a Spanish missionary
 Virginia Morell: "Island ark", National Geographic Magazine August 2008; link

 
Islands of Equatorial Guinea
Gulf of Guinea
History of Equatorial Guinea
Former colonies in Africa
Former Portuguese colonies
Former Spanish colonies
Portuguese colonisation in Africa
Spanish Africa
Former English colonies